Monasterio de Santa Catalina de Montefaro is a monastery in Galicia, Spain.

Monasteries in Galicia (Spain)
Buildings and structures in the Province of A Coruña